The following is a list of woodcuts by the German painter and engraver Albrecht Dürer.

Art catalogs
One of the earliest list of woodcuts by Dürer was assembled in 1808 by Adam Bartsch in his "Le Peintre Graveur" volume 7 and in the appendix. In 1862 Johann David Passavant expanded "Le Peintre Graveur" adding additional woodcuts. Bartsch and Passavant works, which were organized alphabetically, are the source of "B." and "P." numbers, referenced by all the later books. Another often cited reference is 1903 "Catalogue of Early German and Flemish Woodcuts in the British Museum, Vol. 1" by Campbell Dodgson organized by date and often referenced using "C. D." numbers. In the list below numbers used in 1938 "Albrecht Dürer: Complete woodcuts" (German: Albrecht Dürer: Sämtliche Holzschnitte) by Otto Fischer were provided, as this book offers a catalog of most Dürer woodcuts printed in the original size.

List of woodcuts 
Authorship of many woodcuts is uncertain, with different sources disagreeing if the woodcut was made by Dürer alone, with help of one of his students, or by one of his students with or without Dürer supervision. For some prints we also have only copies from late printings, which could be by Dürer or a copy of a lost print by him. The prints with uncertain authorship will be marked by a note below the title. The list below contains great majority of the prints which were included in one of the Dürer's catalogue raisonné indicated, even if the source was not certain of the authorship or considered it to be work of School of Dürer.  The list below includes some woodcut illustrations from books by Dürer, but many more were omitted or included in latter sections.

Illustrations from Books

Ritter von Turn (1493)
Set of 45 illustrations from "Ritter von Turn" or "The Book of the Knight of the Tower" published in 1493, which are attributed to Dürer.

The Comedie of Terence (ca. 1493)
List of illustrations from "The Comedie of Terence" published around 1493, which are attributed to Dürer.

Ship of Fools (1494)

List of illustrations from the book "Ship of Fools", which are attributed to Dürer.

Salus anime (1503)

Set of 63 illustrations from the book "Salus anime", which are attributed to Dürer.

Four Books on Human Proportion (1528)
Among his many manuscripts Durer, along with his wife Agnes and friend Willibald Pirckheimer (posthumously) published "Four Books on Human Proportion". Many of Durer's handmade drawings were drawn on a grid to help him simplify the proportions of people in motion.

Illustrations from the book "Four Books on Human Proportion" (German: Vier Bücher von Menschlicher Proportion).

References

Additional Sources
 Borer (Alain) & Bon (Cécile). L'oeuvre Graphique De Albrecht Dürer. Hubschmid & Bouret. 1980.

 
Woodcuts
Durer